SoftMaker Presentations is a presentation program compatible with Microsoft PowerPoint. It is part of the SoftMaker Office productivity suite but also released as registerware.

SoftMaker Presentations is available for Microsoft Windows, macOS, Linux and Google Android, iOS.

The application is compatible with Microsoft PowerPoint's .pptx, .ppt, and .pps files.

SoftMaker Presentations offers a choice of a Ribbon-styled user interface or traditional menus and toolbars.

History
The first version of SoftMaker Presentations was released in November 2007 as part of the commercial SoftMaker Office productivity suite and carried the version number "2008". In May 2011, this version was also released as freeware.

The second release was SoftMaker Presentations 2010, released in November 2009 as part of SoftMaker Office 2010. This release added a sidebar similar to the one in Microsoft PowerPoint, video export, DirectX-accelerated animations and transitions, support for picture collections, and improved PDF export.

References

External links
 Official Website In English

Presentation software
Presentation software for Windows
Presentation software for macOS
Linux software
Android (operating system) software